Capulhuac is one of 125 municipalities, in the State of Mexico in Mexico. The municipal seat is Capulhuac de Mirafuentes.  The municipality covers an area of 21.5 km².

As of 2005, the municipality had a total population of 30,838.

Notable people
 Cristina Martinez, Mexican chef

References

Municipalities of the State of Mexico
Populated places in the State of Mexico